Yenifakılı is a town and district of Yozgat Province in the Central Anatolia region of Turkey. According to 2000 census, population of the district is 15,603 of which 8,558 live in the town of Yenifakılı.

Notes

References

External links
 District governor's official website 
 General information on Yenifakılı 

Populated places in Yozgat Province
Districts of Yozgat Province